Erik Persson (25 April 1914 – 24 September 1969) was a Swedish wrestler. He competed in the men's freestyle bantamweight at the 1948 Summer Olympics.

References

1914 births
1969 deaths
Swedish male sport wrestlers
Olympic wrestlers of Sweden
Wrestlers at the 1948 Summer Olympics
Sportspeople from Malmö
20th-century Swedish people